The Financial Transparency Coalition is a group that brings together civil society and governments around the world to stem illicit financial flows that are costing developing countries nearly a trillion dollars each year. The Coalition was formerly known as the Task Force on Financial Integrity and Economic Development.

Membership 

According to its website, the members of the coordinating committee responsible for its operations are Centre for Budget and Governance Accountability, Christian Aid, Eurodad, Fundación SES, Global Financial Integrity, Global Witness, LATINDADD, Tax Justice Network, Tax Justice Network Africa, and Transparency International. Coalition administration is managed by a neutral secretariat based at the Center for International Policy in Washington, DC.

The Coalition includes a non-voting Partnership Panel of Governments and Foundations.  Its members are:
 Canadian International Development Agency
 Ford Foundation
 Government of Belgium
 Government of Chile
 Government of Denmark
 Government of Finland
 Government of France
 Government of Germany
 Government of Greece
 Government of India
 Government of the Netherlands
 Government of Norway
 Government of Peru
 Government of South Africa
 Government of Spain
 Leading Group on Innovative Financing for Development

Policy 

The Coalition advocates around six policy areas for greater financial transparency – public country-by-country reporting of sales, profits, and taxes paid by multinational corporations; public registers of beneficial ownership of business entities; automatic cross-border exchange of tax information; open data; ensuring that the institutions making international standards are equitable; holding the enablers of illicit financial flows accountable.

See also 
 Financial Action Task Force on Money Laundering
 Illicit financial flows
 Raymond W. Baker

External links 

  Official website
  Official blog
 Financial Transparency Coalition on Facebook
 on Twitter

References 

 

Crime prevention